Chiel Mathijs Warners (born 2 April 1978 in Harderwijk, Gelderland) is a former Dutch decathlete.

Achievements

External links
 
 Chiel Warners profile at IAAF
 
 

1978 births
Living people
People from Harderwijk
Sportspeople from Gelderland
Dutch decathletes
Olympic athletes of the Netherlands
Athletes (track and field) at the 2004 Summer Olympics